Adam Bock (born November 4, 1961) is a Canadian playwright currently living in the United States. He was born in Montreal, Quebec, Canada. In the fall of 1984, Bock studied at the National Theater Institute at The Eugene O'Neill Theater Center. He is an artistic associate of the Shotgun Players, an award-winning San Francisco theater group. His play Medea Eats was produced in 2000 by Clubbed Thumb, which subsequently premiered his play The Typographer's Dream in 2002. Five Flights was produced in New York City by the Rattlestick Playwrights Theater in 2004.

The Thugs opened Off-Off-Broadway in a production by SoHo Rep in October 2006, directed by Anne Kauffman. He won a 2006-07 Obie award, Playwriting, for The Thugs.

During the 2007-2008 New York theatrical season, two plays by Bock were produced Off Broadway: The Receptionist at Manhattan Theatre Club in 2007 and The Drunken City, originally commissioned by the Kitchen Theatre Company in Ithaca, New York, at Playwrights Horizons.

Bock is openly gay and often writes about homosexuality.  He is quoted as saying "I'm a gay playwright. I like being called a gay playwright. It's who I am. It's how I write. I have a very specific take on the world because I'm gay."

Bock has been nominated for two 2007-2008 Outer Critics Circle Awards. Both The Receptionist and The Drunken City were nominated for Outstanding Off-Broadway Play. In 2012, he won a John Simon Guggenheim Memorial Foundation Fellowship for his work.

Bock's play A Small Fire ran December 16, 2010 – January 23, 2011 Off-Broadway at Playwrights Horizons, under the direction of Trip Cullman. A Life premiered Off-Broadway at Playwrights Horizons on September 30, 2016 (previews), starring David Hyde Pierce and directed by Anne Kauffman. A Life was nominated for the 2017 Drama Desk Awards: Outstanding Play; David Hyde Pierce as Outstanding Actor in a Play; Anne Kauffman for Outstanding Director of a Play; Laura Jellinek for Outstanding Set Design for a Play; and Mikhail Fiksel for Outstanding Sound Design in a Play.

Plays 
 The Shaker Chair
 Five Flights (Produced in New York City, 2004)
 Swimming in the Shallows (Produced by Second Stage Theatre Off-Broadway, 2005; produced by Whim Productions, 2019)
 Three Guys and a Brenda (Produced at the Humana Festival of New American Plays, 2006)
 The Typographer's Dream - (Produced by Clubbed Thumb in New York, 2002)
 The Thugs (Produced by SoHo Rep Off-Off-Broadway, 2006; produced by Portland Center Stage, Portland, OR, 2007)
 A Roadside Garden
 Medea Eats - (Produced by Clubbed Thumb in New York, 2000)
 Percy Stripped Down
 The Gayboy Nutcracker
 Thursday
 The Drunken City (Produced by Playwrights Horizons in New York, 2008)
 The Receptionist - (Premiered Off-Broadway 2007; Produced by Portland Center Stage in Portland, OR, 2010 and Cygnet Theatre Company in San Diego, CA, 2010)
 The Flowers - (Premiered at About Face Theatre in Chicago, October 2009)
 A Small Fire (Produced Off-Broadway by Playwrights Horizons, 2011; produced by Philadelphia Theatre Company at the Suzanne Robert Theatre, 2019)
 A Life (Produced by Playwrights Horizons Off-Broadway, 2016)
 Before The Meeting (Produced by Williamstown Theater Festival, 2019)
The Canadians (Produced by South Coast Repertory, 2019)

References

External links
 
 Playscripts, Inc. - Adam Bock
 Shotgun Players Alumni Page
 Interview with Outzonetv.com

21st-century Canadian dramatists and playwrights
Living people
Canadian LGBT dramatists and playwrights
Canadian gay writers
Writers from Montreal
Canadian male dramatists and playwrights
21st-century Canadian male writers
1961 births
21st-century Canadian LGBT people
Gay dramatists and playwrights